István Tóth may refer to:

 István Tóth (boxer) (1938–1999), Hungarian Olympic boxer
 István Tóth (canoeist), Hungarian sprint canoer
 István Tóth (chemist), Australian peptide researcher
 István Tóth (footballer) (1891–1945), Hungarian amateur footballer and football manager
 István Tóth (wrestler) (born 1951), Hungarian wrestler
 István Tóth (shortest man claimant)